Shad Kam (also Romanized as Shād Kām) is a village in Mobarakeh Rural District, in the Central District of Bafq County, Yazd Province, Iran. At the 2006 census, its population was 89, in 39 families.

References 

Populated places in Bafq County